The 2005 National Women Football Championship was the inaugural of the National Women Football Championship, the top-tier of women's football in Pakistan.

The event took place from 23 to 29 September 2005 at Jinnah Sports Stadium in Islamabad.

Punjab won the championship by beating WAPDA 1-0 in the final. Balochistan beat Sindh in the third-place playoff to clinch the third position.

Teams 
Eight teams took part in the event.

 Azad Jammu & Kashmir
 Balochistan
 Football School of Excellence
 Islamabad
 Punjab
 NWFP
 Sindh
 WAPDA

References 

National Women Football Championship seasons